Whitney Lynn is an American contemporary artist and academic. Much of her work is sculptural and performance-based, incorporating found objects and materials from various cultural and historical sources. Her work deals with topics of boundaries and containment, issues of power and control, concepts of perception and value,  and relationships of art history and vernacular forms.

Early life and education 
Lynn was born on Williams Air Force Base in Maricopa County, Arizona. She earned a Bachelor of Fine Arts from the VCU School of the Arts in 2004 and Master of Fine Arts from the San Francisco Art Institute.

Career 
She has taught at Stanford University and is currently an Assistant Professor in Interdisciplinary Visual Art at the University of Washington.

Lynn has produced exhibitions, installations, performances, and artist-led participatory projects for the de Young Museum, The Neon Museum, San Diego International Airport, the Internet Archive, and Yerba Buena Center for the Arts.

References 

American women artists
1980 births
Living people
San Francisco Art Institute alumni
Artists from San Francisco
21st-century American women